Daan Nieber (born in Amsterdam on November 6, 1980) is a Dutch journalist who worked for the PowNed public broadcasting association. He reported for the daily PowNews news programme.

He was a presenter of the short-lived Dutch version of CQC on Veronica alongside Pieter Jouke and Beau van Erven Dorens.

In 2021, he appeared in the television game show De Verraders.

References

External links
 

1980 births
Living people
Dutch journalists
Dutch reporters and correspondents
Writers from Amsterdam
21st-century Dutch people